Stockade Companies is a multi-concept restaurant company based in Round Rock, Texas.

Stockade Companies, LLC grew from a single Sirloin Stockade restaurant, founded in 1966, to now having over 80 restaurants under three brands: Sirloin Stockade, Montana Mike's and Coyote Canyon.  Sirloin Stockade is a steakhouse and buffet restaurant featuring all-you-can-eat breakfast, lunch and dinner. Montana Mike's is a full-service steakhouse, and Coyote Canyon is a casual low-price buffet restaurant found in 8 states: Illinois, Indiana, Iowa, Kansas, Missouri, North Dakota, Oklahoma, and Texas.

The restaurants are located in nine mid-western states and Mexico.  The company is owned by the management team consisting of Tom Ford and Doug Frieling.

References

External links
Stockade Companies LLC

Food and drink companies of the United States
Companies based in Round Rock, Texas